The Southern Oklahoma Cosmic Trigger Contest is a soundtrack by The Flaming Lips to the Bradley Beesley fishing documentary Okie Noodling, featuring three country-tinged songs not found elsewhere, two of which are instrumentals.

It was distributed as a promotional CD at early screenings of the film.

The first track has the following spoken introduction: "when Bradley first told me, I guess maybe a year and a half ago, about making this little movie about okie noodling, I'd really never heard of the term noodling before and for some reason I immediately imagined it was about, of all things, masturbation. I guess it sort of... Oh, it sounded sort of funny and perverted and that's just what I thought. And even though Bradley continued sort of talking, telling about his idea, all this stuff kind of happening in a, you know, a couple of seconds, my mind was still building up this bizarre masturbation story and so by now I was thinking that he was going to make a movie about this cult of teenagers living in Southern Oklahoma who have these, you know, bizarre masturbation contests and I was thinking what a crazy movie that would be... But anyway, I eventually snapped out of my daydreaming and quickly realized he was talking about a weird kind of fishing where guys use their hands instead of rods and hooks. And though it wasn't as interesting as what I was imagining, it seemed at least absurd and I figured if Bradley was doing it is would entertaining just the same. So when he eventually asked me to contribute to music for his movie, I agreed with him that it should have a kind of playful, adult, country feel to it, not too hillbilly and not too swampy, and his examples that he leans towards were sort of classic Glen Campbell stuff, which, you know, is great stuff. And, as we got towards finishing up the music and he got finished making up his movie, he was still wishing for something from us that I was singing on, because up until then it was all just music and sound-oriented compositions and I told him that I would try to come up with something. And though I tried, I couldn't connect this fishing thing with the bigger, sort of cosmic theme without sounding like some, you know, kind of back-to-nature zen bullshit and I didn't want this. I wanted, you know, something that was playful and absurd, and then I was kind of reminded of this, you know, my initial imaginings of the cult of masturbating teenagers and, within moments, I had the basic song sort of done. And though it doesn't really mention fishing anywhere in it, the theme of entertaining yourself with your hands was my ridiculous way of connecting them".

Track listing

Footnotes and references

External links
 Official Okie Noodling film site

2001 EPs
The Flaming Lips EPs